Ivana Jankovská (born 17 November 1963) is a Czech former professional tennis player.

Biography
Born in Přerov, Jankovská began competing on the professional tour in 1989.

Jankovská was most successful as a doubles player, with 14 ITF titles and a best ranking of 103 in the world. At grand slam level, Jankovská's best performance came at the 1991 French Open, where she and her regular doubles partner Eva Melicharová made the round of 16 of the women's doubles.

Retiring from tennis in 1994, Jankovská now runs a tennis school in Freiberg, Germany.

ITF finals

Doubles (14–11)

References

External links
 
 

1963 births
Living people
Czechoslovak female tennis players
Czech female tennis players
Sportspeople from Přerov